The 1993 Autoglass Classic was a women's tennis tournament played on indoor carpet courts at the Brighton Centre in Brighton, England that was part of the Tier II of the 1993 WTA Tour. It was the 16th edition of the tournament and was held from 19 October until 24 October 1993. First-seeded Jana Novotná won the singles title and earned $70,000 first-prize money.

Finals

Singles
 Jana Novotná defeated  Anke Huber 6–2, 6–4
 It was Novotná's 2nd singles title of the year and the 7th of her career.

Doubles
 Laura Golarsa /  Natalia Medvedeva defeated  Anke Huber /  Larisa Savchenko 6–3, 1–6, 6–4

References

External links
 International Tennis Federation (ITF) tournament event details
 Tournament draws

Autoglass Classic
Brighton International
Autoglass Classic
Autoglass Classic
Brighton
Bright